The Sugiura pistol is a Japanese-designed handgun that was manufactured in the puppet state of Manchukuo for issue to occupying forces.  The handgun is chambered in the .32 ACP (7.65 mm Browning) cartridge, is of straight blow-back operation and has an eight-round box magazine.  The finish is salt-blue and the grips are checkered walnut.  From photographic evidence, the design appears to have been inspired by the Colt 1903.

References

External links
 Video showing the Sugiura
 .25 ACP variant shown

.32 ACP semi-automatic pistols
.25 ACP semi-automatic pistols
Semi-automatic pistols of Japan
Firearms of the Republic of China
World War II infantry weapons of Japan
Semi-automatic pistols of Manchukuo
Weapons and ammunition introduced in 1945